Fairvale High School is a government-funded co-educational comprehensive secondary day school, located in Fairfield West, a south-western suburb of Sydney, New South Wales, Australia.

Established in 1969, the school caters for approximately 1,500 students from Year 7 to Year 12. The school is operated by the New South Wales Department of Education.

Campus
Fairvale is known to many for its unusual Binishell. The Binishell, also known as "The Golf Ball", "Marshmallow" and "The Beanie," is spherical in shape and was recently painted mint green. The Binishell is created through a process in which a concrete membrane is blown up and allowed to set. It serves the purpose of a gym, dance hall, performance hall, and general assembly hall. Also to be noted is that the first attempt at building the Binishell in 1974 resulted in disaster when the foundations failed the Binishell and it collapsed in the centre. There were no injuries.

In 2009, the Foley Centre was upgraded with an art and dance/drama space, including a full wall of mirrors, Harelquinn floors, and lighting and sound infrastructure. In 2010, the school also received a new Language Centre, refurbished hospitality standard kitchens, 6 new science labs and the new covered walkways.

The Canley Vale Tutorial Centre, which serves students who have had difficulty completing their education in a mainstream school, is an annex to the school; however, it is not on the same site, but is near the close by Canley Vale Public School.

Curriculum
In addition to traditional core subjects, Fairvale students may study Music, Dance (to year 12), Drama, PE. Visual Arts, Spanish & French languages to HSC, Mandarin in Year 8, commerce and business studies. Vocational education courses are available in hospitality, tourism, business services, retail, ICT, and construction.

Extracurricular activities
Student activities and groups include The Duke of Edinburgh's Award, LEOs Club, Personal Development/Health/Physical Education, Rotary, String Ensemble, Vocal group, Junior and Senior Dance ensembles, Various Rock Bands and Student Representative Council.

Notable alumni

 Bill HarriganAustralian former rugby league referee
 Raechelle Bannoactress from Home and Away
 Alex Pappsactor and television host
 Tony Popovicsoccer player
 Stephen CowanCorporate Executive, current Chief Commercial Officer at Coates.
 Sandy Li Co-founder & COO at PUSHAS. Forbes 30 Under 30 2022 (Asia - Retail & Commerce).

References

External links
 
 Fairvale High Youtube Links

Educational institutions established in 1969
South Western Sydney
Public high schools in Sydney
1969 establishments in Australia